Marcin Grzybowski (born 10 January 1979) is a Polish sprint and marathon canoeist who has competed since the early 2000s. He won three medals in the C-4 500 m event at the ICF Canoe Sprint World Championships with two silvers (2003, 2006), and a bronze (2002).

Grzybowski also competed in the C-1 1000 m event at the 2008 Summer Olympics in Beijing, but was eliminated in the semifinals.  At the 2012 Summer Olympics, he competed in the C-2 1000 m with Tomasz Kaczor, again being eliminated in the semi-finals.

References

Sports-reference.com profile

1979 births
Canoeists at the 2008 Summer Olympics
Canoeists at the 2012 Summer Olympics
Living people
Olympic canoeists of Poland
Polish male canoeists
People from Czechowice-Dziedzice
ICF Canoe Sprint World Championships medalists in Canadian
Sportspeople from Silesian Voivodeship